Blue Springs is a town in Barbour County, Alabama, United States. At the 2020 census, the population was 84. The town is the home of Blue Springs State Park.

Geography
Blue Springs is located at 31°39'51.588" North, 85°29'45.308" West (31.664330, -85.495919).

Demographics

As of the census of 2000, there were 121 people, 49 households, and 36 families residing in the town. There were 54 housing units at an average density of 18.7 per square mile (7.2/km2). The racial makeup of the town was 99.17% White and 0.83% Black or African American.

There were 49 households, out of which 28.6% had children under the age of 18 living with them, 67.3% were married couples living together, 6.1% had a female householder with no husband present, and 24.5% were non-families. 20.4% of all households were made up of individuals, and 10.2% had someone living alone who was 65 years of age or older. The average household size was 2.47 and the average family size was 2.84.

In the town, the population was spread out, with 22.3% under the age of 18, 7.4% from 18 to 24, 28.1% from 25 to 44, 31.4% from 45 to 64, and 10.7% who were 65 years of age or older. The median age was 39 years. For every 100 females, there were 95.2 males. For every 100 females age 18 and over, there were 95.8 males.

The median income for a household in the town was $38,000, and the median income for a family was $38,250. Males had a median income of $27,000 versus $21,500 for females. The per capita income for the town was $17,224. There were 6.5% of families and 4.3% of the population living below the poverty line, including no under eighteens and 33.3% of those over 64.

Points of interest
 Blue Springs State Park is a  property along the West Fork Choctawhatchee River near the center of town. It features a spring pool, campground and picnicking.
 Blue Reindeer Creek is a designated site of historical interest.

References

External links
Blue Springs State Park

One of the Best Small Towns in Alabama

Towns in Alabama
Towns in Barbour County, Alabama